Acaroba is a village in the Şehitkamil District, Gaziantep Province, Turkey. The village is inhabited by Turkmens of the Jerid tribe and had a population of 234 in 2021.

References

Villages in Şehitkamil District